Pacific Northwest University of Health Sciences (PNWU) is a private medical school in Yakima, Washington. Founded in 2005, the university's inaugural program was the first new medical school to open in the Pacific Northwest in sixty years. PNWU grants the Doctor of Osteopathic Medicine (D.O.) degree and graduated its first class of physicians in May 2012. It is accredited by the American Osteopathic Association's Commission on Osteopathic College Accreditation.

History
The Pacific Northwest University of Health Sciences opened in 2005, after planning and fundraising to open a new osteopathic medical school in Washington State.  In 2007, PNWU received provisional accreditation.  In 2008, the first courses began, and the university's main building, Butler-Haney Hall, opened at a cost of $13 million.  In 2009, the university received a $400,000 federal grant to expand the College of Allied Health Sciences. In 2012, the inaugural class of 69 students graduated, earning the Doctor of Osteopathic Medicine degree.

Initially, PNWU encountered challenges finding rotation sites for medical students, as hospital already offering training to students from the University of Washington refused additional students. The school advocated for a state bill, which was passed into law, preventing hospitals.

In 2015, PNWU was awarded a $1.75 million grant to develop an interprofessional education program from the Health Resources and Services Administration.

Academics

The Pacific Northwest University of Health Sciences consists of a single college, the College of Osteopathic Medicine, which grants the Doctor of Osteopathic Medicine (DO) degree.  It is a four-year program.  Years 1 and 2 of the DO program consist primarily of classroom-based learning, which focus on the basic sciences.

Years 3 and 4 of the DO program consist of clinical rotations in off-site communities.  The school currently has 18 sites for clinical rotations over the five-state region of Alaska, Idaho, Montana, Oregon, and Washington.  Students are required to go to many parts of the Northwestern United States to receive hands-on training. These sites include Fairbanks, Alaska; Blackfoot, Idaho; and Portland, Oregon among 15 others.

Campus
The campus now consists of four buildings. Butler-Haney Hall is the center of the school where instruction and training occur, as well as housing the College of Osteopathic Medicine's Library. A new addition to Butler-Haney Hall was completed in 2013. Cadwell Center opened in January 2011, and provides additional rooms for study, classroom and research space. A new University Conference Center was complete by the spring of 2015 and this building coupled with Iron Horse Lodge (Administration building) brings the total of four buildings to the growing PNWU campus. Starting in the fall of 2015 PNWU in conjunction with Washington State University will be opening a Pharmacy school which will be granting PharmD degrees. A local business developer is in the finishing touches of completing a three-story series of single-, two- and three-bedroom apartments immediately to the south of campus.

Construction on Project NEXT, a 35,000 square-foot addition to campus. The space aims to add additional resources for increased interprofessional education.

Students

A total of 568 students are in attendance at PNWU for the 2017-2018 academic year.  About 52 percent of PNWU students are female; 48 percent are male. About 67% are White/Non-Hispanic, 13% Asian/Pacific Islander, 6% Hispanic, 4% Black or African American, 6% identify as two or more ethnicities, and the remaining 3% of students are of undeclared ethnicity.

Students at PNWU participate in a number of clubs on campus and an active student government association.  Clubs on campus include: American College of Osteopathic Emergency Physicians (ACOEP), American College of Osteopathic Family Physicians (ACOFP), American Medical Student Association (AMSA).  There is an active chapter of Sigma Sigma Phi, the osteopathic honors society.

Accreditation
Pacific Northwest University of Health Sciences is accredited by the Northwest Commission on Colleges and Universities, and the College of Osteopathic Medicine is accredited by the American Osteopathic Association's Commission on Osteopathic College Accreditation.

See also
 List of medical schools in the United States

References

External links
Official website

Osteopathic medical schools in the United States
Medical schools in Washington (state)
Educational institutions established in 2008
Universities and colleges accredited by the Northwest Commission on Colleges and Universities
Private universities and colleges in Washington (state)
Education in Yakima, Washington
2008 establishments in Washington (state)